Henry Arthur Stanistreet (19 March 1901 – 4 September 1981), was the 14th Bishop of Killaloe and Clonfert.

Stanistreet was educated at Trent College and Trinity College, Dublin and  ordained in 1924. He was a curate at Clonmel and then curate in charge of Corbally before becoming the Rector of Templeharry with Borrisnafarney. From 1931 to 1943 he was Rural Dean of Ely O’Carroll then Dean of Killaloe Cathedral. He was ordained to the episcopate in 1957. He became a Doctor of Divinity (DD).

References

1901 births
1981 deaths
People educated at Trent College
Alumni of Trinity College Dublin
Church of Ireland deans
20th-century Anglican bishops in Ireland
Bishops of Killaloe and Clonfert